Solveig Hoogesteijn, born in Sweden, is a noted Venezuelan motion picture writer, producer and director.

Film creations
She wrote, produced and directed El Mar del tiempo perdido (The Sea of Lost Time, 1981) Manoa (1980), Manoa - Flucht aus der Zeit. The latter film was an adaption for German made-for-TV movie.)' Alemania puede ser muy bella, a veces (1982) (Germany can be very beautiful, sometimes); Macu, la Mujer del Policía (Macu, the Policeman's Woman); Santera;

Hoogesteijn co-wrote, and served as executive producer on the film Maroa, which was Venezuela's Official Selection for the 79th Academy Awards for Best Foreign Language Film in 2007.
Her films won 14 International Awards and 20 National Awards. Her second film MAROA participated at the Quinzaine des Realisateurs at the Cannes Film Festival in 1981.

Personal life
Hoogesteijn is the second daughter of a Dutch father and a German mother who migrated to Venezuela in 1947. For more than 30 years her father directed a German-language radio program in Caracas called La Hora Alemana (The German Hour) which addressed all German speaking audiences: Germans, Austrians, Swiss, Czechs, etc.

She studied High School at the Humboldt German School in Caracas. She pursued Art and Literature studies in Venezuela's Universidad Central de Venezuela in Caracas. She then went abroad to study filmmaking between 1971 and 1976 at the University of Television and Film Munich (Hochschule für Fernsehen und Film, München). Hoogesteijn was married to Venezuelan jazz saxophonist, composer and actor Víctor Cuica, who has shared credits in several of her films, being in charge of their music soundtracks and, in some cases, acting in main roles. They have one son. 

Her knowledge of European culture and Latin American societies, has defined her task of building bridges between the two continents through culture. Since 2001 she directs a cultural center in Caracas, the TRASNOCHO CULTURAL, a private Foundation that diffuses culture in all its expressions: film, theater, visual arts, literature, music, gastronomy, history and vanguardist media, becoming the most important cultural centre in Venezuela. Its management model, that relies exclusively on the income of the audience, has marked a new model in cultural management in her country, providing full programatic liberty in the programming for already 18 years.

Filmography
 1975: Puerto Colombia 1977: El Mar Del Tiempo Perdido (The Sea Of Lost Time)
 1980: Manoa 1980: Manoa - Flucht aus der Zeit (for TV) 
 1982: Alemania Puede Ser Muy Bella, a Veces (Germany Can Be Very Beautiful, Sometimes)
 1987: Macu, La Mujer Del Policía (Macu, The Policeman's Woman)
 1994: Santera''
 1999: “En Busca de Humboldt”, (In Search of Humboldt") documentary
 2005: Maroa

See also
List of Venezuelan films

External links

2003 Interview (in Spanish)

1946 births
Venezuelan women film directors
Living people
People from Caracas
Venezuelan people of Dutch descent
Venezuelan people of German descent